Redfield Records is a German independent label founded in Haan-Gruiten near Düsseldorf in 2001 and now residing in Melle near Osnabrück. In February 2013 the label founded their subsidiary under the name Redfield Digital which distribute only digital music worldwide.

The releases We Are the Mess by Electric Callboy and My Longest Way Home by Any Given Day marked the first two charting albums released by the label ever.

Signed artists

Redfield Records

Currently signed 
 Any Given Day
 A Traitor Like Judas
 Alex Amsterdam
 Anchors & Hearts
  Antillectual
 Breathe Atlantis
 Burning Down Alaska
  Cedron
 Dampfmaschine
 Desasterkids
 Flash Forward
  Forever In Combat
  For I Am King
  Gameface
 Iron Walrus
  Kids Insane
  Mutiny on the Bounty
 Neberu
  New Deadline
  Shoot the Girl First
  Taped
 The Pariah 
 Team Stereo

Former bands 
  Abandon All Ships
 A Case of Grenada
 Alias Caylon
 Andthewinneris
 Crash My DeVille
 Das Pack
  Death Letters
 Diatribe
  Electric Callboy
 Elwood Stray
 Estrich Boy
  Eye Sea I
  Face Tomorrow
 Fidget
 Fire in the Attic
  Get Involved
 Go as in Gorgeous
  Heroes & Zeros
 His Statue Falls
  Jeff Caudill
  John Coffey
 KMPFSPRT
  Living with Lions
  Lower Than Atlantis
  March
 Me In A Million
  Nations Afire
 Narziss
 On When Ready
  Scarred by Beauty
  Sights & Sounds
 Sixxxten
  Social Suicide
 Sonah
 Summer’s Last Regret
  Texas in July
  Textures
 That Very Time I Saw
 The Blackout Argument
 The Ordinary Me
 The Parachutes
  The Sedan Vault
 The Sunchild
 Trip Fontaine
  Verses
 Vitja
 We Butter the Bread with Butter
  We Came as Romans
 We Set the Sun
  Your Hero

Redfield Digital

Currently signed 
  Abstracts
 As We Go
 Blessed With Rage
 Burning Down Alaska
 Defy Your Dreams
  Final Story
 From What We Believe
 Keep It For Tomorrow
 Malcolm Rivers
 Ocean of Plague
  Sever Black Paranoia
  Shell Beach
  Simon
 Texas Local News
 Via
  Wolves Scream

Former bands 
  A Ghost of Flare
  All the Shelters
  Bring Back Persephone
 Flash Forward
 Forever Ends Today
  For I Am King
  Freedom for Your Life
 The Grandtry
  Kids Insane
 Lasting Traces
  Mireau
  New Deadline
  Rise of the Bait
  Seventribe
  Shake Well Before
  Skywalker
  Surrender the Coast
 Swallow Your Pride
  Taped
  Wrong Way to Die
  You May Kiss the Bride

Distributors (list) 
  AL!VE AG
  Max Music
  Suburban
  Storm Warning Entertainment/Code 7 Music/Plastic Head Distribution
  Sugar & Spice
  Soundworks
  Interpunk
  CR Japan
  Rockoff
  Supersounds
  Spicy Music
  Mystic Production
  Fiomusica
  Impexcom
  Sound Pollution
  Audioglobe
  Indiego

References

External links 
 Official Homepage (Deutsch/Englisch)
 Official Homepage subsidiary (Englisch)
 Redfield Records at Facebook
 Redfield Records on Twitter
 Redfield Records on MySpace
 Redfield Records at YouTube
 Redfield Records at Soundcloud

German independent record labels